Herman Snellen (February 19, 1834 – January 18, 1908) was a Dutch ophthalmologist who introduced the Snellen chart to study visual acuity (1862). He took over directorship of the Netherlands Hospital for Eye Patients (Nederlandsch Gasthuis voor Ooglijders), after Franciscus Donders.

Early life
Snellen studied medicine at Utrecht University under Donders, Gerardus Johannes Mulder and Jacobus Schroeder van der Kolk. He earned his medical degree in 1858. He specialized in ophthalmology and worked as an assistant physician at the Netherlands Hospital for Eye Patients after he had completed his degree.

Director
He was named to succeed Donders as the institute's director in 1884, a position he served until 1903. In 1877, he was appointed as a professor of ophthalmology at Utrecht University. He did research on astigmatism, glaucoma and other eye diseases as well as research on correction of visual acuity using eyeglasses and  ophthalmological surgery.

Chart
While alternative versions had been developed before him, by Eduard Jäger von Jaxtthal and others, Snellen developed his eye chart in 1862 to measure visual acuity, which rapidly become the global standard. The most significant innovation was his use of what he called optotypes, specially designed characters generated on a 5x5 grid, rather than using standard fonts. They provide a physical standard measure that could be used when printing the chart. Standard vision was measured as the ability to correctly read a line of optotype characters when they subtended 5 minutes of arc and were separated by 1 minute of arc.

Since its inception, more copies of the Snellen Chart have been sold in the United States than any other poster. It remained a ubiquitous standard in medical offices into the 21st century.

References

External links
Biography

Dutch ophthalmologists
19th-century Dutch inventors
1834 births
1908 deaths
People from Zeist
Utrecht University alumni
Academic staff of Utrecht University